Tipton Harriers were created in September 1910, when the members of the Tipton branch of Birchfield Harriers resolved to end their connection and become independent. Soon, over 40 members were meeting and training regularly from a former painters' workshop and store in a loft behind a shop and houses in Waterloo Street. These primitive facilities, sparsely furnished, using two 18 feet square, 8 inches deep beer cooling vats as baths with water heated in an old copper washing boiler, remained the club H.Q. until 1936. The house where the formation took place was demolished in the 1960s.

Much of this happened despite serious bomb damage during the Zeppelin raids in 1916 and the obstruction of the non-improving landlady.

In competition the green and white hooped vests with the whippet emblem surmounting the slogan "Swift and Eager", soon became a force to be reckoned with in cross-country competition. This despite the demands of the armed forces and munitions work during World War 1, and the ravages caused by the economic depressions of the 1920s and early 1930s when at times up to 80% of the members were unemployed. After the war membership grew and club branches were founded at Wolverhampton, Dudley, Wednesbury and Cradley Heath until this practice was banned by the M.C.A.A.A. in 1924.

The first major team successes, winning the Midlands 'junior' and Staffordshire Championships arrived in the 1925–26 season where they were also runners-up in the Midland Senior Championship. This marked the beginning of the first golden age for the club, which was dominated by two outstanding individuals, Jack Holden and the club president 'Innie' Palethorpe. Together they transformed the image and the reputation of the club.

The Harrier public house, which opened on Powis Avenue in the 1950s, is named after Tipton Harriers.

The club train at Tipton Sports Academy on the Wednesbury Oak Road. They are regularly on top in the Triangle League (A league between Wolves and Bilston AC, Tipton Harriers and Dudley and Stourbridge Harriers) and also produce talent capable of being near the highest level

External links 
Tipton Harriers Website 

Sports clubs established in 1910
Sport in Sandwell
Athletics clubs in England
1910 establishments in England
Tipton